Formby is a civil parish in Sefton, Merseyside, England.  It contains 27 buildings that are recorded in the National Heritage List for England as designated listed buildings.   Of these, two are listed at  Grade II*, the middle of the three grades, and the others are at Grade II, the lowest grade.  Most of the parish is occupied by the town of Formby, and the majority of the listed buildings are cottages or houses and associated structures, the oldest cottages dating back to the 16th century with a timber-framed core.  The other listed buildings include churches and associated structures, a former convent, a schoolhouse converted into a restaurant, a set of stocks, and a cross on a roundabout.

Key

Buildings

References
Citations

Sources

Listed buildings in Merseyside
Lists of listed buildings in Merseyside
Listed buildings in Formby